Zavara Mponjika (born Ramadhani Mponjika; 24 November 1968, Dar es Salaam) or simply MC Rhymson is a rapper from Tanzania who was the founder of the Villain Gangsters and a founding member of Kwanza Unit.

In the early 1990s the Tanzanian hip hop of Dar es Salaam was polarized with one side pushing for a populist hip hop that they hoped would become the dominant musical form in the area and the other concerned with a purist interpretation that aligned with the mission of American hip hop and was sung in English. Kwanza Unit is seen as the strongest progenitor of this style, which according to Rhymson was formed "in response to the outcome at Yo! Rap Bonanza, which they thought was a slight to their version of hip hop".

The struggling Tanzanian economy and the rise of ‘hip hop nationalism’ served as a broader socio-economic backdrop for the group expansion of what MC Rhymson termed the ‘Kiswacentric’ concept. Rhymson's efforts to create this hip hop nation, coined Kwanzania, is one of his largest contributions to Tanzania's hip hop scene as he tried to create a hypothetical community whose "cementing force is hip hop."

Creating this hypothetical, yet important space for hip hop in Tanzania was a way to unite rappers to lyrically express their culture, values and goals, and overall way of life. Rhymson along with the other members of Kwanza unit developed ideologies and ethics to accompany the concept of Kwanzania to romanticize and idealize these hip hop artists involved as "heroic warriors resisting oppression" echoing an old mentality of rising a country from a colonial state into an independent country called ujamaa.

Currently Rhymson lives in Canada with his wife. He, along with the other members of Kwanza Unit, are still involved in their own music productions. Rhymson at this time is doing solo rhymes and home-produced beats.

Discography 
Kwanza Unit produced three albums, Tucheze, (1994), Tropical Tekniqs, (1995) and Kwanzanians (1999), the latter of which received the most support.

References

Living people
Tanzanian rappers
1968 births
20th-century Tanzanian male singers
21st-century Tanzanian male singers
 Tanzanian hip hop musicians
 Tanzanian Bongo Flava musicians
 Swahili-language singers